The Violin Sonata No. 10 in G major, Op. 96, by Ludwig van Beethoven was written in 1812, published in 1816, and dedicated to Beethoven's pupil Archduke Rudolph Johannes Joseph Rainier of Austria, who gave its first performance, together with the violinist Pierre Rode.

Structure and analysis

It has four movements:

Allegro moderato (in G major)
Adagio espressivo (in E-flat major)
Scherzo: Allegro - Trio (in G minor, Trio in E-flat major, ends in G major)
Poco allegretto (in G major)

The final movement was written with Pierre Rode's style in mind. Shortly before completing the work, Beethoven wrote to the Archduke Rudolph “… I did not make great haste in the last movement for the sake of mere punctuality, the more because, in writing it, I had to consider the playing of Rode. In our finales we like rushing and resounding passages, but this does not please R and — this hinders me somewhat.” As a result, the finale was a set of seven variations and a short coda on a cheerful theme.

The work takes approximately 27 minutes to perform.

It is described as the loveliest of his violin sonatas, with "calm, ethereal beauty" and "a searching test for the players. Everything must be right, from the very first trill". The opening trill is an integral part of the subject.

Notes and references

External links
 
Performance by Corey Cerovsek (violin) and Paavali Jumppanen (piano)] from the Isabella Stewart Gardner Museum in MP3 format
 
 
 
 
 
 Dmitri Smirnov The Anatomy of Beethoven’s 10th Violin Sonata

1812 compositions
Violin Sonata 10
Compositions in G major
Music dedicated to students or teachers
Music dedicated to nobility or royalty